Jerome Everton Taylor (born 22 June 1984) is a Jamaican cricketer who has played as a fast bowler for the West Indies. Taylor eventually picked up 100 wickets for the Windies in both tests and odis. During 2017 he reversed an initial decision to retire from international cricket. Taylor has also featured for Jamaica, English sides Somerset, Leicestershire and Sussex, CPL teams St Lucia Zouks and Jamaica Tallawahs and IPL sides Pune Warriors and Mumbai Indians in his cricketing career.

International career

Early playing days
As a youngster, Taylor was introduced to cricket by his father who also was a cricketer in his own right. Though he took up carpentry and track and field in his teenage years, he remained fond of cricket for the most part. As he grew up wanting to become a fast bowler, admiring legends such as Wasim Akram, Curtly Ambrose, Courtney Walsh and Glenn McGrath. Taylor made his ODI debut on 11 June 2003, claiming 2 for 39 in the 3rd one day international against Sri Lanka at the Arnos Vale Ground, St Vincent and the Grenadines. During his debut season for Jamaica, he was named the most promising fast bowler of the 2003 Carib Beer Cup, picking up 21 wickets at an average of 20.14. Soon after he was selected onto the West Indies's 14 man squad for the first test against Sri Lanka. Taylor made his debut in the first test played at the Beausejour Stadium in St Lucia. He eventually dismissed Marvan Atapattu to pick up his first test wicket, in the 2nd and final test of the series played at Sabina Park, Jamaica.

Later career
On June 30, 2006, Taylor picked up his first five wicket haul on day one of the fourth test of India's 2006 tour of the Caribbean. He then established himself as a regular in the ODI side as the Windies' leading wicket-taker during the DLF Cup in Malaysia with eight dismissals. He was also selected for the 2006 Champions Trophy and claimed four wickets in the preliminary games against Zimbabwe and Bangladesh. He later took a hat-trick in West Indies' opening group game of the 2006 ICC Champions Trophy against Australia, becoming the first West Indian to achieve such a feat in a one-day international. Earlier, Taylor had bowled Ricky Ponting for just 1. With 21 runs required and 14 balls remaining, Taylor had Michael Hussey bowled for 13, then dismissed Brett Lee lbw on the very next but last ball of that over. Returning to deliver the final over, he bowled Brad Hogg to complete the hat-trick. He finished with four for 49, which was his second-best ODI figures. Taylor picked up a total of 13 wickets to be the leading wicket taker in that edition of the tournament. He also shares the record, with Pakistan's Hasan Ali for being the highest wicket taker in any edition of the ICC Champions Trophy. On November 20, 2006, Taylor claimed 5 for 37 in the first innings of the second test against Pakistan at the Multan Cricket Stadium, Multan. Taylor went on to win the Emerging Player of the Year award at the 2007 WIPA Awards.

On 7 December 2007 Taylor claimed a matchwinning haul of 5 for 48 in the 4th ODI against Zimbabwe at the Queens Sports Club, Bulawayo. He was also named the man of the match for his feats with the ball in that encounter.
On 16 December 2007 he took a triple wicket maiden in the 1st T20I against South Africa at the Sahara Oval. He also won Jamaica Cricketer of the Year, on 3 December 2008, at the Jamaica Cricket Association's annual function held at the Courtleigh Auditorium in New Kingston. On 13 December 2008 Taylor scored 106, his maiden first-class hundred, in the 1st Test against New Zealand at the University of Otago Oval. With 17 fours and eight sixes, his 107 ball century came batting at number 8 in a 153 run partnership with Shivnarine Chanderpaul. On 8 February 2009 he picked up 5 for 11 in the second innings of the first test at Sabina Park, to help the Windies to resounding victory over England. Taylor went on to win an ESPN Cricinfo award for the best bowling performance in Test Cricket for 2009.

In September 2014 Taylor scored 40 and later picked up his 100th test wicket, dismissing Robiul Islam for a duck, with eventual second innings figures of 3 for 39 in the Windies' 296 run second test win over Bangladesh. This triumph at Saint Lucia's Beausejour Cricket Ground, capped off a 2-0 whitewash in the test series. On 11 October 2014 he claimed his 100th wicket in one day internationals, bowling Shikhar Dhawan for a duck. This came in the 2nd ODI of the Windies 2014 tour of India played at the at the Feroz Shah Kotla Ground.

He later took career best figures of 6 for 47 in the first innings of the second and final test of Australia's 2015 tour of the Caribbean.
On 23 September 2016, Taylor along with Dwayne Bravo, put together a 66 run partnership during the 1st T20I against Pakistan, played at the Dubai International Stadium in Dubai, United Arab Emirates. In so doing they both set the record for the highest ever 9th wicket partnership in T20I history.

Domestic career 
Taylor joined English county cricket side Leicestershire in the summer of 2007. During the 2009 IPL auction he was picked up by the Kings XI Punjab for that season's tournament. However, due to injuries sustained from a vehicular accident he was unable to feature and was thus replaced by South African left arm seamer Yusuf Abdulla. In July 2016 Taylor joined Caribbean Premier League side St Lucia Zouks. On 3 April 2016 Taylor joined IPL outfit Mumbai Indians, as a replacement for injured Sri Lankan pacer Lasith Malinga, for the remainder of the 2016 IPL season.  On 24 April 2017 he signed up with Sussex to play in the Royal London One Day Cup. He later took a hattrick in an eventual defeat to Essex in the One Day Cup. He then moved to Somerset in July 2018 to feature in the county's Vitality Blast campaign. He later took 5 for 15 in a 16 run win over Hampshire at Taunton. Taylor became only the third Hampshire bowler to claim a five wicket haul in T20 cricket. He eventually played 44 matches picking up 22 wickets at an average of 16.64 during his debut season at the club. In February 2020 Taylor signed a three year deal with Gloucestershire as a Kolpak player.

References

External links 

1984 births
Living people
West Indies One Day International cricketers
West Indies Test cricketers
West Indies Twenty20 International cricketers
Jamaica cricketers
Pune Warriors India cricketers
Jamaican cricketers
Leicestershire cricketers
One Day International hat-trick takers
People from Saint Elizabeth Parish
Cricketers at the 2007 Cricket World Cup
Cricketers at the 2015 Cricket World Cup
Mumbai Indians cricketers
Ruhuna Royals cricketers
Jamaica Tallawahs cricketers
Saint Lucia Kings cricketers
Sussex cricketers
Somerset cricketers
Hobart Hurricanes cricketers